Col Bayard  (1,246 m) is a mountain pass through the Dauphiné Alps in the department of Hautes-Alpes in France.

It connects the communities of La Mure and Gap.

See also
 List of highest paved roads in Europe
 List of mountain passes
 Route Napoléon

References

Mountain passes of Provence-Alpes-Côte d'Azur
Landforms of Hautes-Alpes
Transport in Auvergne-Rhône-Alpes